The 1914 United States Senate election in Vermont took place on November 3, 1914. Incumbent Republican William P. Dillingham successfully ran for re-election to another term in the United States Senate, defeating Charles A. Prouty. This was the first United States Senate direct election to take place in Vermont following the ratification of the Seventeenth Amendment to the United States Constitution.

General election

Results

References

1914
Vermont
1914 Vermont elections